"Esclavo de Sus Besos" is a song performed by Spanish singer David Bisbal. It was written by José Abraham / Juanma Leal. The song was released as the lead single from Bisbal's fourth studio album Sin Mirar Atrás in August 2009.

The song debuted in the Spanish Singles Chart in the week of 30 August 2009 at number six, being the highest debut for the week. Three weeks later the track peaked at number-one during four consecutive weeks. In United States the song debuted in the charts in the week of September 26, 2009 climbing to the top ten of the Billboard Top Latin Songs chart four weeks later. "Esclavo de Sus Besos" peaked at number-one on 31 October 2009 replacing "Loba" by Colombian singer-songwriter Shakira, being succeeded by fellow Spanish performer Alejandro Sanz three weeks later. The song became Bisbal's third number-one hit in the chart, following "¿Quién Me Iba a Decir?" (2006) and "Aquí Estoy Yo", his collaboration with Luis Fonsi, Aleks Syntek and Noel Schajris. The official remix features reggaeton romantic duo Magnate & Valentino, or an urban remix.

Sales:
Spain: 2xplatinum (+80,000)
Argentina: 2xPlatinum (+40,000)

See also
List of number-one songs of 2009 (Mexico)

References

2009 songs
David Bisbal songs
Spanish-language songs
Number-one singles in Spain
Universal Music Latino singles